Ulrike von der Groeben, Ulrike Elfes (born 25 March 1957 in Mönchengladbach) is a German television sport journalist.

Life 
Von der Groeben works at German television broadcaster RTL as sport journalist. Von der Groeben is married to Alexander von der Groeben and has two children, Max and Caroline.

External links

References 

German sports journalists
German sports broadcasters
German reporters and correspondents
1957 births
Living people
Sportspeople from Mönchengladbach
RTL Group people